The 1982–83 Oklahoma Sooners men's basketball team represented the University of Oklahoma in competitive college basketball during the 1982–83 NCAA Division I season. The Oklahoma Sooners men's basketball team played its home games in the Lloyd Noble Center and was a member of the National Collegiate Athletic Association's (NCAA) former Big Eight Conference at that time.  The team posted a 24–9 overall record and a 10–4 conference record to finish second in the Conference for head coach Billy Tubbs.

The team was led by All American and Big Eight Conference Men's Basketball Player of the Year Wayman Tisdale.  Oklahoma lost in the quarterfinals of the Big Eight Tournament to Kansas.  The team received a bid to the 1983 NCAA Division I men's basketball tournament as No. 7 seed in the Mideast region. After an opening round win over UAB, the Sooners lost to Indiana in the second round.

Over the course of the season, Wayman Tisdale established school records for single-game points (51) and single-season points (810).

Roster

Schedule and results

|-
!colspan=9 style=| Regular Season

|-
!colspan=9 style=| Big Eight Tournament

|-
!colspan=9 style=| NCAA Tournament

Rankings

Honors
All-American: Wayman Tisdale (1st of 3 times)
Big Eight POY: Tisdale

References

Oklahoma Sooners men's basketball seasons
Oklahoma
Oklahoma